WTJS (93.1 FM) is a radio station broadcasting an Adult Contemporary Christian format. Licensed to Alamo, Tennessee, United States, the station is currently owned by Grace Broadcasting Services, Inc.

On December 29, 2021, WTJS changed its format from news/talk to Christian adult contemporary as "Good News 93.1".

Former logo

References

External links

Crockett County, Tennessee
Radio stations established in 1973
1973 establishments in Tennessee
Mainstream adult contemporary radio stations in the United States
Christian radio stations in Tennessee